The baselines of the Philippines are the set of geodesic lines completely encircling the Philippine archipelago from where the maritime entitlements of the country are measured from. It was first established in 1961 by an act of the Congress of the Philippines which was further amended in April 2009 to optimize and conform it to the United Nations Convention on the Law of the Sea, which the Philippines is a signatory to. A total of 101 basepoints providing for 100 baselines were identified under Republic Act No. 9522, which identified Amianan Island as the northernmost, Frances Reef as the southernmost, Pusan Point as its easternmost and the Balabac Great Reef as the westernmost points of the main Philippine archipelago.

Background 
The Philippines is an archipelago of 7,100 islands customarily enclosed by the lines demarcated by the Treaty of Paris in 1898 and the Convention Between the United States and Great Britain in 1930, which came to be known in the Philippines as its International Treaty Limits. The government of the Philippines has maintained its position that the waters enclosed by the demarcation lines in the said treaties form part of its territorial waters regardless of its breadth and dimension.

Baselines 
The geographic coordinates below are referenced to the World Geodetic System 1984.

See also 
 Extreme points of the Philippines

References

External links

 Republic Act No. 3046, An Act to Define the Baselines of the Territorial Sea of the Philippines
 Republic Act No. 5446, An Act to Amend Section One of Republic Act Numbered Thirty Hundred and Forty-six, Entitled “an Act to Define the Baselines of the Territorial Sea of the Philippines”
 Republic Act No. 9522, An Act to Amend Certain Provisions of Republic Act No. 3046, as Amended by Republic Act No. 5446, to Define the Archipelagic Baselines of the Philippines, and for Other Purposes

Geography of the Philippines
Law of the Philippines
Law of the sea
Borders of the Philippines